Drummond is a regional county municipality in the Centre-du-Québec region of Quebec, Canada. The seat is Drummondville.

Subdivisions
There are 18 subdivisions within the RCM:

Cities & Towns (1)
 Drummondville

Municipalities (12)
 Durham-Sud
 L'Avenir
 Lefebvre
 Saint-Bonaventure
 Saint-Cyrille-de-Wendover
 Saint-Edmond-de-Grantham
 Saint-Eugène
 Saint-Félix-de-Kingsey
 Saint-Germain-de-Grantham
 Saint-Guillaume
 Saint-Lucien
 Wickham

Parishes (4)
 Notre-Dame-du-Bon-Conseil
 Sainte-Brigitte-des-Saults
 Saint-Majorique-de-Grantham
 Saint-Pie-de-Guire

Villages (1)
 Notre-Dame-du-Bon-Conseil

Demographics
Mother tongue from 2016 Canadian Census

Transportation

Access Routes
Highways and numbered routes that run through the municipality, including external routes that start or finish at the county border:

 Autoroutes
 
 

 Principal Highways
 
 
 
 

 Secondary Highways
 
 
 
 
 

 External Routes
 None

See also
 List of regional county municipalities and equivalent territories in Quebec

References

Census divisions of Quebec